Keeper may refer to:

People
 Keeper (surname)
 Archivist
 Beekeeper
 Gamekeeper
 Gatekeeper
 Greenkeeper
 Keeper of the Privy Purse
 Keeper of the Royal Archives
 Legal guardian
 Lighthouse keeper
 Museum curator
 Prison warden
 Regius Keeper of the Royal Botanic Garden Edinburgh
 Zookeeper

Sports 
 Goalkeeper, a player who protects a goal
 Quarterback keeper, a slang term for a play in American football
 Wicket-keeper, a position in cricket

Literature
 Keeper: Living with Nancy, a 2009 biographical book by Andrea Gillies
 Keeper (Peet novel), a 2003 sports novel by Mal Peet
 Keeper (Appelt novel), a 2010 novel by Kathi Appelt

Video games
 In Homeworld 2, Keepers are deadly destroyers built by the ancient Progenitors
 In Thief (series) games, a Keeper is a member of a secret society who are charged with "keeping the balance" of power even within The City
 The Keepers (Mass Effect), a fictional artificial species from the BioWare game Mass Effect
 Keepers, an artificial life-forms that protect the Earth in the Nintendo game Sin & Punishment: Star Successor
 The Keeper, a playable character in the game The Binding of Isaac: Rebirth introduced in the Afterbirth DLC

Other
 Keeper (film), a 2015 film
 Keeper (chemistry) a small quantity of solvent added in an evaporative procedure to prevent analyte loss
 The Keepers, English title of Head Against the Wall, a 1959 French drama film directed by Georges Franju
 Keeper (password manager)
 Keeper Hill, an Irish mountain
 In the game of Quidditch from Harry Potter, a position that defends the goal hoops
 Keeper (Transformers), a comics character
 Keeper, see Drakh, a parasitic creature in the universe of Babylon 5
 Magnet keeper
 Menstrual cup
 Strike plate of a door latch
 Keeper, a space wizard from the TV show Dino Charge
 Keeper, a slang term for a romantic partner of either sex who has shown the attributes of someone worth hanging on to in a relationship
 Keeper is one English translation for the Arabic Khasadar, who are/were a Pakistani government funded but locally recruited security force in Khyber Pakhtunkhwa.

See also
 Goalkeeper (disambiguation)
 Keepers (disambiguation)
 The Keeper (disambiguation)